Colm McMahon (born 10 December 1976) is an Irish former rugby union player for Munster, where he is currently head of rugby development. He played as a flanker.

Munster
McMahon represented Shannon and Munster during his playing career, before joining Munster as a coach development officer in 2009, as well as coaching roles at various age grades for Ireland. In 2011, he became an elite development officer for Munster's academy, a role he held until 2020, when he replaced the outgoing Ultan O'Callaghan as Munster's head of rugby development. McMahon was also an interim forwards coach for Munster during the early games of the 2019–20 season, as Graham Rowntree, newly appointed to the role, was away at the 2019 Rugby World Cup with Georgia.

References

External links
Munster Profile

Living people
1976 births
Rugby union players from County Clare
Irish rugby union players
Irish rugby union coaches
Shannon RFC players
Munster Rugby players
Rugby union flankers